Wells is a city in Faribault County, Minnesota, United States.  The population was 2,343 at the 2010 census.

History
Wells was laid out in 1869. The city was named for J.W. Wells, father in law of Clark W. Thompson.

The city contains a property listed on the National Register of Historic Places: the former Chicago, Milwaukee, St. Paul and Pacific Depot and Lunchroom.

Geography

Minnesota State Highways 22 and 109 are two of the main routes in the city. Interstate 90 is located six miles south of Wells on Highway 22.

Climate

Demographics

2010 census
As of the census of 2010, there were 2,343 people, 1,013 households, and 635 families living in the city. The racial makeup of the city was 96.9% White, 0.2% African American, 0.2% Native American, 0.8% Asian, 0.9% from other races, and 1.1% from two or more races. Hispanic or Latino of any race were 7.3% of the population.

There were 1,013 households, of which 27.3% had children under the age of 18 living with them, 48.7% were married couples living together, 10.0% had a female householder with no husband present, 4.0% had a male householder with no wife present, and 37.3% were non-families. 33.9% of all households were made up of individuals, and 18.7% had someone living alone who was 65 years of age or older. The average household size was 2.26 and the average family size was 2.87.

The median age in the city was 45.3 years. 22.6% of residents were under the age of 18; 6.2% were between the ages of 18 and 24; 20.8% were from 25 to 44; 27.6% were from 45 to 64; and 22.6% were 65 years of age or older. The gender makeup of the city was 47.9% male and 52.1% female.

2000 census
As of the census of 2000, there were 2,494 people, 1,032 households, and 665 families living in the city. The racial makeup of the city was 96.31% White, 0.04% African American, 0.16% Native American, 0.68% Asian, 0.00% Pacific Islander, 2.17% from other races, and 0.64% from two or more races.  4.73% of the population were Hispanic or Latino of any race.

There were 1,032 households, out of which 28.3% had children under the age of 18 living with them, 53.1% were married couples living together, 7.8% had a female householder with no husband present, and 35.5% were non-families. 32.2% of all households were made up of individuals, and 19.7% had someone living alone who was 65 years of age or older.  The average household size was 2.33 and the average family size was 2.94.

In the city, the population was spread out, with 23.3% under the age of 18, 7.3% from 18 to 24, 22.1% from 25 to 44, 21.3% from 45 to 64, and 26.0% who were 65 years of age or older.  The median age was 43 years. For every 100 females, there were 87.5 males.  For every 100 females age 18 and over, there were 82.6 males.

The median income for a household in the city was $26,463, and the median income for a family was $38,523. Males had a median income of $27,969 versus $19,873 for females. The per capita income for the city was $15,614.  9.8% of the population and 5.9% of families were below the poverty line.   7.4% of those under the age of 18 and 15.1% of those 65 and older were living below the poverty line.

Transportation
Land was purchased in 1964 to build an airport.  The Wells Municipal Airport opened in August 1966.

Notable people
Larry Buendorf, US Secret Service agent who subdued Squeaky Fromme.
David M. Carey, Veterinarian and Minnesota state senator
Remember L. H. Lord, businessman and Minnesota state legislator
Charles Leonard Todd, Minnesota state aenator, farmer, and businessman
Eric Oren, Minnesota state legislator and businessman
Frederic Warde, printer, type and book designer.

References

External links
City of Wells, MN -- Official site
United South Central Schools site
Wells Chamber of Commerce site

Cities in Faribault County, Minnesota
Cities in Minnesota